Invasive species are species that are native to foreign environments which may have important effects on a specific area's economy, ecosystem and infrastructure. These species can be introduced by natural causes or human intervention. There are many invasive species that exist around the world. One that is abundant around Puerto Rico is the lionfish. The United States Department of Agriculture (USDA)'s Animal and Plant Health Inspection Service (APHIS) Plant Protection and Quarantine (PPQ) and Customs and Border Protection (CBP) perform biosecurity inspections for Puerto Rico.

Mammals 
 Mongoose: Sugar planters introduced Urva auropunctata, called the "small Indian mongoose", to Puerto Rico in the nineteenth century as a way to control the invasive rat population. Although it was immediately incredibly successful in improving crop yields, they are also responsible for 70% of all rabies cases, albeit that rabies is quite rare, on the island. Note that until recently, the species was believed to be U. javanicus, and most sources still classify the creature under this species. The two taxa are impossible to distinguish without genetic testing. It was introduced in either 1877 or 1887 to the island. It is also believed to prey on the native fauna of the island.
 Pigs: Introduced in the 1500s by the Spanish, now feral in the capital San Juan and elsewhere. United States Department of Agriculture Animal and Plant Health Inspection Service has been attempting - so far unsuccessfully - to eradicate them.

Birds 

 Columba livia: more commonly known as the rock pigeon, is an invasive bird brought introduced through early European movement throughout the Caribbean. The species typically has a grey body with a white colored rump, but the body color can vary between gray, white, tan, and brown. Throughout history, this animal was bred and used for a multitude of activities including homing and competitive racing. In modern times, they are more commonly utilized as a pastime, where people enjoy feeding and watching them. This particular bird can adapt to live in a variety of environments, including farm yards, grain elevators, feed mills, parks, city buildings, bridges, and more. Rock pigeons have been known to transmit diseases such as salmonella, food poisoning, cryptococcosis, toxoplasmosis, and more. The droppings of rock pigeons can also lead to increased deuteriation of building material, causing issues for urban areas within Puerto Rico.

Reptiles 
 Although once believed to be native to the island, green iguana may have been introduced to Puerto Rico in the modern era. Green iguanas are native to South and Central America. The species is considered invasive due to the damage it carries out on local agriculture and the threat it poses to native species.

Plants 

 Abrus precatorius: Is a flowering plant better known as "jequirity bean" or "rosary pea" which is notorious for invading warm tropical areas. This nitrogen fixing plant is known to alter soil nutrients and heavily impact native species via allelopathic effects. At the end of the twentieth century, it was declared an invasive weed by Puerto Rico and much of the Caribbean Islands. Once this plant has fully matured, their roots become difficult to remove, adding to this weeds notoriety. The most common removal method was using herbicides such as glyphosate, causing other unintended drawbacks on ecosystems which were invaded. Native species and humans also have to worry about consuming this plant, as it contains toxins which can be detrimental to their health with enough consumption.

Arthropods 
The overwhelming majority of arthropods intercepted by border pest inspections came from elsewhere in the Caribbean. Despite a large amount of cargo traffic in both directions, Florida sends more adventive arthropods to PR than the other way around, probably due to laxer biosecurity on the PR side.

Insects 
95% of arthropod border interceptions are insects.

Acari 
Only 4% of arthropod border interceptions are acari.

References 

Biota of Puerto Rico
Environmental issues in Puerto Rico
Puerto Rico
Puerto Rico